Zalim Khasanbiyevich Makoyev (born 24 August 1994) is a Russian football right back. He plays for PFC Spartak Nalchik.

Club career
He made his debut in the Russian Football National League for PFC Spartak Nalchik on 28 July 2013 in a game against FC Sibir Novosibirsk.

References

External links
Career summary by sportbox.ru 

1994 births
Sportspeople from Nalchik
Living people
Russian footballers
Association football defenders
PFC Spartak Nalchik players
FC Tyumen players
FC Armavir players
FC Dynamo Stavropol players